Bearwardcote is a civil parish in the South Derbyshire district of Derbyshire, England. According to the 2001 census it had a population of 26.

References

External links

Hamlets in Derbyshire
Civil parishes in Derbyshire
South Derbyshire District